These are the official results of the Men's 3,000 metres Steeplechase event at the 1982 European Championships in Athens, Greece, held at Olympic Stadium "Spiros Louis" on 7 and 10 September 1982.

Medalists

Results

Final
10 September

Heats
7 September

Heat 1

Heat 2

Heat 3

Participation
According to an unofficial count, 26 athletes from 15 countries participated in the event.

 (1)
 (1)
 (1)
 (1)
 (3)
 (3)
 (1)
 (2)
 (2)
 (1)
 (1)
 (3)
 (1)
 (3)
 (2)

See also
 1978 Men's European Championships 3,000m Steeplechase (Prague)
 1980 Men's Olympic 3,000 m Steeplechase (Moscow)
 1983 Men's World Championships 3,000m Steeplechase (Helsinki)
 1984 Men's Olympic 3,000m Steeplechase (Los Angeles)
 1986 Men's European Championships 3,000m Steeplechase (Stuttgart)
 1987 Men's World Championships 3,000m Steeplechase (Rome)
 1988 Men's Olympic 3,000m Steeplechase (Seoul)

References

 Results

3000 metres steeplechase
Steeplechase at the European Athletics Championships